May Blitz is the self-titled debut album by British/Canadian power trio May Blitz. It was released in 1970 by Vertigo Records in the UK, and Paramount Records in the US.

Track listing
All songs written and composed by Hudson/Newman/Black
Side one
Smoking the Day Away - 8:21
I Don't Know - 4:45
Dreaming - 6:35
Side two
Squeet - 6:51
Tomorrow May Come - 4:48
Fire Queen - 4:18
Virgin Waters - 7:01

Personnel
James Black — guitars, lead vocals
Reid Hudson — bass, backing vocals
Tony Newman — drums, vibes, congas, bongos

Producer – May Blitz
Artwork – Tony Benyon
Engineer – Barry Ainsworth
Composers – May Blitz

References

1970 debut albums
May Blitz albums